The Woodland Carbon Code is the UK standard for afforestation projects for climate change mitigation. It provides independent validation and verification and assurance about the levels of carbon sequestration from woodland creation projects and their contribution to climate change mitigation.

The Code, which sets out project design and management requirements, was established in 2011 to promote best practice procedures for organisations wanting to create woodland to mitigate their carbon emissions. Compliance with the code means that woodland carbon projects are responsibly and sustainably managed to national standards; will have reliable estimates for the amount of carbon that will be sequestered or locked up as a result of the tree planting; be publicly registered and independently verified; and meet transparent criteria and standards to ensure that real carbon benefits are delivered.

Every Woodland Carbon Code project appears on the UK Register of Woodland Carbon Projects; registry services are provided by Markit. All project developers and carbon buyers will have an account on the registry, which also contains project information and documentation, as well as the facility to list, track ownership and retire carbon units. Projects and their documentation are validated at the outset by a third party accredited by the UK Accreditation Service (UKAS). An ongoing monitoring programme for the woodland will have also been agreed at the time of validation and projects will be verified by an accredited third party at regular intervals.

Woodland Carbon Code projects generate Woodland Carbon Units, which once verified can be used by UK businesses to help compensate for their gross emissions.

Requirements of the code
 register your project on the UK Land Carbon Registry, stating the location and providing a map and carbon calculation.
 meet national forestry standards to ensure the woodland is sustainably and responsibly managed
 have a long-term management plan
 use standard methods for estimating the carbon that will be sequestered
 demonstrate that the project delivers additional carbon benefits than would otherwise have been the case

History

The Carbon Advisory Group
The Forestry Commission set up a Carbon Advisory Group of UK forest industry and carbon market experts in 2008 to advise on woodland carbon management and develop industry guidelines and standards. These have since evolved to become the Woodland Carbon Code.

Pilot Phase: 2010-2011
Between August 2010 and July 2011 the Woodland Carbon Code was piloted at a number of sites across the UK . Several projects, comprising a variety of woodland types, were designed and validated under the draft criteria of the code. Following feedback from the pilot phase, final amends were made to the Code before being launched in 2011.

Launch
In July 2011, approval was given for CO2 abatement from Woodland Carbon Code projects to be reported, under UK government guidance on how to measure and report greenhouse gas emissions. This enabled UK investors and businesses to accurately communicate details of their woodland creation projects in greenhouse gas reports for the first time.

Group Scheme Pilot: 2012-2013
In 2012 and early 2013 group validation was piloted. This is an alternative approach to certification under the Woodland Carbon Code which allows owners of small woodlands, which may not have been viable to validate on their own, to become certified under a single statement, enabling financial costs to be shared. In May 2013 the group validation scheme was officially launched.

Carbon registry
The Woodland Carbon Code was launched on the Markit Environmental Registry in summer 2013.

The UK Land Carbon Registry now houses credits from both the Woodland Carbon Code and the Peatland Code.

Verified Woodland Carbon Units can be used by companies with UK-based emissions to come to a net figure, as set out in the UK's Environmental Reporting Guidelines.  All projects also help the UK meet its greenhouse gas emissions reduction commitments - There are no Corresponding Adjustments made for verified Woodland Carbon Code units.

See also
Afforestation

References

Sustainable forest management
Forest certification
Forestry and the environment
Forests and woodlands of the United Kingdom
Forestry in the United Kingdom
Biosequestration